Camp Caesar, also known as the Webster County 4-H Camp, is a historic campsite located at Cowen, Webster County, West Virginia.  It has 20 contributing buildings, 5 contributing sites, 13 contributing structures, and 3 contributing objects. The camp was established in 1922 by local members of the Farm Bureau and the Webster County extension agent, Julius A. Wolfram.  During the 1920s, an octagonal assembly hall now known as Gregory Hall, a council circle, a dining hall, and a home for the camp caretaker were constructed. After the onset of the Great Depression, the Works Progress Administration built several stone cottages, a pool and poolhouse, dining hall expansion, stone walks, retaining walls, and other features.

It was listed on the National Register of Historic Places in 2009.

References

External links
Camp Caesar website

American Craftsman architecture in West Virginia
1922 establishments in West Virginia
Buildings and structures in Webster County, West Virginia
Bungalow architecture in West Virginia
National Register of Historic Places in Webster County, West Virginia
Caesar
Works Progress Administration in West Virginia
Temporary populated places on the National Register of Historic Places